Rural Route 5 is a Canadian documentary film, directed by Richard Lavoie and released in 1994. The film centres on the changing nature of agriculture in the late 20th century, through a profile of farmers in the Lanaudière region of Quebec who are coping with changes in the industry.

The film won the Prix L.-E.-Ouimet-Molson from the Association québécoise des critiques de cinéma in 1996.

References

External links

1994 films
1994 documentary films
Canadian documentary films
National Film Board of Canada documentaries
Quebec films
French-language Canadian films
1990s Canadian films